Senator Coe may refer to:

George Coe (Michigan politician) (1811–1869), Michigan State Senate
Hank Coe (born 1946), Wyoming State Senate
Henry Waldo Coe (1857–1927), Oregon State Senate
John D. Coe (1755–1824), New York State Senate
John W. Coe (1839–1890), New York State Senate
Louise Holland Coe (1894–1985), New Mexico State Senate